The GLAAD Media Award for Outstanding Music Artist is an annual award honoring musicians who use songs, music videos and live performances to accelerate LGBTQ acceptance. The artists may be LGBTQ or allies. Artists are eligible who have released a full-length or EP-length album, or single sold through a major retail or online music store. In addition to the music itself, media interviews, public statements and other information may be considered when selecting nominees and award recipients. It is one of several categories of the GLAAD Media Awards presented by GLAAD, a US non-governmental media monitoring organization founded in 1985 (formerly called the Gay & Lesbian Alliance Against Defamation) at ceremonies in New York, Los Angeles and San Francisco between March and June.

The award was introduced in 2003 as a competitive category at the 2nd GLAAD Media Awards, where it was given to the American rock band Two Nice Girls. The category initially had five nominees, but this was increased to up to ten nominees as of the 28th GLAAD Media Awards. To date there has been one tie, with Adam Lambert and Frank Ocean co-winning the award in 2013 for Trespassing and Channel Orange, respectively. The award's current recipient is Lil Nas X for Montero.

At the 32nd GLAAD Media Awards, a companion category, Outstanding Breakthrough Music Artist, was introduced.

Winners and nominees

1990s

2000s

2010s

2020s

References

GLAAD Media Awards
LGBT-related music